Edward Henry Whinfield (1836–1922) was a translator of Persian literature. He wrote the first well-commented English translations of Hafez and Rumi, as well as a side-by-side translation of 500 quatrains of the Rubáiyát of Omar Khayyám in 1883.

References

External links 

 
 
 

1836 births
1922 deaths
Translators of Omar Khayyám
Persian–English translators